The 2012 Vic Open was held from December 13 to 16 at the Club de curling Victoria in Quebec City, Quebec as part of the 2012–13 World Curling Tour. The event was held in a round robin format, and the purse for the event was CAD$10,000, of which the winner, Simon Dupuis, received CAD$1,800. Dupuis defeated Philippe Lemay in the final with a score of 8–6.

Teams
The teams are listed as follows.

Though the event is listed on the men's World Curling Tour, one women's team, skipped by Marie-France Larouche, was allowed to participate.

Round robin standings
Final Round Robin Standings

Tiebreaker

Playoffs
The playoffs draw is listed as follows:

References

External links

Vic Open
Curling competitions in Quebec City
2012 in Quebec